Metropolitan Court is a different type of court found in the metropolitan city of Bangladesh. As per the Criminal Procedure Code (CrPC) of 1898, the constitution, procedure, forces and jurisdiction of this court are resolved. The Code of Criminal Procedure used to acknowledge two sorts of courts: the Sessions court and the Judge court.

After the commencement of Metropolitan Police in 1976, the statute was revised in 1976 by an Ordinance and became effective in 1979. As indicated by this revised law, separate metropolitan courts in metropolitan cities have to be set up by the government. By this revision, the Criminal Procedure, at present recognizes the two kinds of judicature based on establishment's location. The first one in District Courts, situated in Districts and the second is the Metropolitan Courts situated in the Metropolises.
As of 2020 only the flowing five cities have metropolitan courts:
Dhaka
Chittagong
Rajshahi
Khulna
Sylhet

Classification
Generally, Metropolitan court deals the criminal offenses occur in the metropolitan area. Currently, only Metropolitan Sessions courts are found in Bangladesh. Metropolitan Court doesn't deal with Civil cases. Thus Metropolitan courts are of 2 subtypes of session or criminal. Those are,

 Metropolitan Sessions Judge Courts
 Metropolitan Magistrate Courts

Metropolitan Sessions Judge Courts
Metropolitan Sessions Judge courts are presided by Sessions judges. It has started to function from 1999. There are two additional type of session judge courts namely, Addition Metropolitan Sessions Judge courts and Joint Metropolitan Sessions Judge courts.

Metropolitan Magistrate Courts

Metropolitan Magistrate Courts are presided by Judicial Magistrate who are appointed by the Government. These magistrates work under the supervision session judge. There are three types of Metropolitan Magistrate Courts. Those are,
 Chief Metropolitan Magistrate Courts
 Additional Chief Metropolitan Magistrate Courts
 Metropolitan Magistrate Courts(1st Class)

See also
Judiciary of Bangladesh

References

Law of Bangladesh
Judiciary of Bangladesh